Joel F. Salatin (born February 24, 1957) is an American farmer, lecturer, and author.

Salatin raises livestock on his Polyface Farm in Swoope, Virginia, in the Shenandoah Valley. Meat from the farm is sold by direct marketing to consumers and restaurants.

Early life and education
Salatin's father worked for a major petroleum company, using his earnings to purchase a 1,000-acre farm in Venezuela. The family left Venezuela in 1959 following the 1958 election of President Rómulo Betancourt who instituted a program to redistribute land.

Influenced by their Biblical understanding of earth stewardship and J. I. Rodale, Salatin's parents, William and Lucille, relocated and purchased a farm in the Shenandoah Valley in 1961 and began restoring its land. In high school, Salatin began his own business selling rabbits, eggs, butter and chicken from the farm at the Staunton Curb Market. He then attended Bob Jones University where he majored in English and was a student leader, graduating in 1979.

Salatin married his childhood sweetheart Teresa in 1980 and became a feature writer at the Staunton, Virginia, newspaper, The News Leader, where he had worked earlier typing obituaries and police reports.

Career

Farming 

Polyface Farm is a  farm in Swoope, Virginia. The farmhouse was built in 1750 and added on throughout the years. It was purchased by the Salatins in 1961. Tiring of writing for the newspaper, Salatin decided to try farming full-time. Each year, he revised his organic farming techniques, which have low overhead and equipment costs, and the farm began to turn a profit. The farm grosses $350,000 and is deemed a commercial farm by the United States Department of Agriculture.

Salatin's philosophy of farming emphasizes healthy grass on which animals can thrive in a symbiotic cycle of feeding. Cows are moved from one pasture to another rather than being centrally corn fed. Chickens in portable coops are moved in behind them, where they dig through the cow dung to eat protein-rich fly larvae while further fertilizing the field with their droppings.

Salatin condemns the negative impact of the United States government on his livelihood because of what he considers an increasingly regulatory approach taken toward farming. He is a self-described "Christian libertarian environmentalist capitalist lunatic farmer", producing meat he describes as "beyond organic", using environmentally responsible, ecologically beneficial, sustainable agriculture. Jo Robinson said of Salatin, "He's not going back to the old model. There's nothing in county extension or old-fashioned ag science that really informs him. He is just looking totally afresh at how to maximize production in an integrated system on a holistic farm. He's just totally innovative."

Commenting on a New York Times op-ed contribution about sustainable farming and bovine methane production, Salatin wrote, "wetlands emit some 95 percent of all methane in the world; herbivores are insignificant enough to not even merit consideration. Anyone who really wants to stop methane needs to start draining wetlands." Wetland methane emissions make up 20 to 39% of global methane emissions, according to the Intergovernmental Panel on Climate Change. He also said that most livestock producers use "Neanderthal management" that exaggerates the amount of land required, and that modern technology allows for far more sustainable land usage.

Writing 
Salatin has been editor of the monthly agriculture magazine Stockman Grass Farmer promoting pasture-grazed lifestock, and teaches a two-day course on agribusiness marketing in conjunction with this magazine. He has authored twelve books including Folks, This Ain't Normal, You Can Farm, Salad Bar Beef and  Everything I Want To Do Is Illegal.

Speaking 
Salatin has spoken as a farming educator at a wide range of organizations including the University of California at Berkeley, and the Stone Barns Center for Food and Agriculture. In 2020, he spoke at the Libertarian National Convention about limiting regulation.

Controversies 
In March 2020, during the COVID-19 pandemic, on his website, Salatin declared he wanted coronavirus. Salatin was widely condemned for his comments by the public and his peers.

In November 2019 Salatin wrote a blog post responding to a blog post by Chris Newman, another Virginia farmer and owner of Sylvanaqua Farms, in which Newman critiques the small family farm model and describes an alternative, vertically integrated system rooted in collective ownership. Salatin said in his article that Newman, who is Black and Native American, was too early in his farming career to know whether he would be successful in the long-term, and that Newman would only "push would-be team players away" by complaining. In August 2020, Agdaily described Salatin's blog post as racially inappropriate, and criticized that he had described Native Americans as "hostile" to William Cody. After Salatin's remarks, Mother Earth News asked Newman to write for the publication for diversity in the wake of the murder of George Floyd. Newman declined the invitation raising concerns about Salatin's article. After public criticism of the publication's support for Salatin, Mother Earth News ultimately severed its relationship with Salatin.

Media 
Salatin's farm, Polyface, is featured prominently in Michael Pollan's book The Omnivore's Dilemma (2006) and the documentary films, Food, Inc. and Fresh. Pollan became interested in Salatin because of his refusal to send food to locations beyond a four-hour drive of his farm, i.e. outside his local "foodshed". "We want [prospective customers] to find farms in their areas and keep the money in their own community", he said. "We think there is strength in decentralization and spreading out rather than in being concentrated and centralized."

Salatin and his farm have also been featured in radio, television and print media including Smithsonian Magazine, National Geographic, Gourmet, and ABC News.

Awards
Salatin received the 15th Annual Heinz Award with special focus on the environment.

Works

 Salad Bar Beef (1996). 
 Pastured Poultry Profits (1996). 
 You Can Farm: The Entrepreneur's Guide to Start & Succeed in a Farming Enterprise (1998). 
 Family Friendly Farming: A Multigenerational Home-Based Business Testament (2001). 
 Holy Cows And Hog Heaven: The Food Buyer's Guide To Farm Friendly Food (2005). 
 Everything I Want To Do Is Illegal: War Stories From the Local Food Front (2007). 
 The Sheer Ecstasy of Being a Lunatic Farmer (2010). 
 
 Fields of Farmers: Interning, Mentoring, Partnering, Germinating (2013). 
 The Marvelous Pigness of Pigs (2016). 
 Your Successful Farm Business: Production, Profit, Pleasure (2017). 
 Polyface Designs: A Comprehensive Construction Guide for Scalable Farming Infrastructure (2020).  (together with Chris Slattery)
 Polyface Micro: Success with Livestock on a Homestead Scale (2021).

See also
 Methanotroph
 Permaculture
 Regenerative agriculture

References

External links
 Polyface Farm
 The Lunatic Farmer

1957 births
Living people
American agricultural writers
American male non-fiction writers
American environmentalists
Farmers from Virginia
American libertarians
Writers from Virginia
People from Augusta County, Virginia
Permaculturalists